Khursa is a Palestinian village located seven kilometers south-west of Hebron. The village is in the Hebron Governorate Southern West Bank. According to the Palestinian Central Bureau of Statistics, the village had a population of 3,440 in 2007.  The primary health care facilities for the village are designated by the Ministry of Health as level 2.

Etymology
According to Palmer, the name Khirbet Kurza means "the ruin of kurza", a pine cone.

History
In 1883, the PEF's Survey of Western Palestine found here "walls, caves, a well, and a vault, probably a cistern. There were several cisterns and a sacred place to the west. Some of the ruins appear to be modern, some ancient."

Footnotes

Bibliography

External links
Survey of Western Palestine, Map 21:    IAA, Wikimedia commons
Kurza Village (fact sheet), Applied Research Institute–Jerusalem, ARIJ
Kurza Village profile, ARIJ
Kurza Village aerial photo, ARIJ
The priorities and needs for development in Kurza village based on the community and local authorities’ assessment, ARIJ

Villages in the West Bank
Hebron Governorate
Municipalities of the State of Palestine